

The Irish-born British artist Francis Bacon (1909–1992) painted 28 known large triptychs between 1944 and 1985–86. He began working in the format in the mid-1940s with a number of smaller scale works before graduating to large examples in 1962. He followed the larger style for 30 years, although he painted a number of smaller scale triptychs of friend's heads, and after the death of his former lover George Dyer in 1971, the three acclaimed "Black Triptychs".

Bacon was a highly mannered artist and often became preoccupied with forms, themes, images and modes of expression that he would rework for sustained periods, often for six or seven-year periods. When asked about his tendency for sequential or repetitive paintings, he explained how, in his mind, images revealed themselves "in series. And I suppose I could go long beyond the triptych and do five or six together, but I find the triptych is a more balanced unit."

He told critics that his usual practice with triptychs was to begin with the left panel and work across. Typically he completed each frame before beginning the next. As the work as a whole progressed, he would sometimes return to an earlier panel to make revisions, though this practice was generally carried out late in the overall work's completion.

List of large triptychs

See also
 Triptychs by Francis Bacon
 List of paintings by Francis Bacon

References

Bibliography
 Baldassari, Anne. Bacon and Picasso. Flammarion, 2005. 
 Davies, Hugh; Yard, Sally. Francis Bacon. New York: Cross River Press, 1986. 
 Dawson, Barbara; Sylvester, David. Francis Bacon in Dublin. London: Thames & Hundson, 2002. 
 Farr, Dennis; Peppiatt, Michael; Yard, Sally. Francis Bacon: A Retrospective. Harry N Abrams, 1999. 
 Russell, John. Francis Bacon (World of Art). Norton, 1971. 
 Sylvester, David. Looking back at Francis Bacon. London: Thames and Hudson, 2000. 

Triptychs
Francis Bacon (artist)
Bacon, Francis